Krutaya is a rural locality (a village) in Lyakhovskoye Rural Settlement, Melenkovsky District, Vladimir Oblast, Russia. The population was 35 as of 2010.

Geography 
Krutaya is located 15 km east of Melenki (the district's administrative centre) by road. Fursovo is the nearest rural locality.

References 

Rural localities in Melenkovsky District